Sugar Rush is a British television comedy drama series developed by Shine TV and broadcast by Channel 4, loosely based on the Julie Burchill novel of the same name. It is centred on the life of a 15-year-old lesbian Kim Daniels, who has moved from London to Brighton on the south coast of England, and copes with her infatuation with Sugar, a heterosexual girl.

Cast

 Olivia Hallinan - Kimberly Daniels, fifteen-year-old protagonist and narrator of the series
 Lenora Crichlow - Maria "Sugar" Sweet, a teenager who lives life without thinking of the consequences
 Sarah-Jane Potts- Saint (real name Sarah), Kimberly's girlfriend in Series 2
 Kurtis O'Brien - Matt Daniels, Kimberly's confused and alienated younger brother
 Sara Stewart - Stella Daniels, Kimberly and Matt's mother
 Richard Lumsden - Nathan Daniels, Kimberly and Matt's father
 Andrew Garfield - Tom, Kimberly's next-door neighbour
 Jalaal Hartley - Mark Evans, Saint's ex-boyfriend
 Laura Donnelly - Beth, Kim's friend and love interest
 Neil Jackson - Dale, a handyman who has an affair with Stella
 Anna Wilson-Jones - Anna, a womaniser who seduces Kimberly

Plot
The first series of Sugar Rush opens with fifteen-year-old Kim (Hallinan) moving to Brighton with her family, and developing a crush on her best friend - heterosexual girl Sugar (Crichlow). Maria "Sugar" Sweet loves reckless drinking, copious sex with men, and doesn't care for school. The series follows Kim as she tries to gain Sugar's affections, leading to Sugar taking advantage of her kindness.

Side plots of series one include Kim's mother Stella (Stewart) having an affair, Kim's brother Matt (O'Brien) thinking he's an alien, and Kim's neighbour Tom (Garfield) desperately trying to date her.

In series two, eighteen months have passed and Kim learns to leave Sugar behind and go on dates with other women, particularly Saint (Potts), who becomes her serious girlfriend. However, Sugar remaining in Kim's life, albeit not romantically, causes friction in Kim's relationship with Saint.

Side plots in series two include Stella and Nathan (Lumsden) attending sex therapy and becoming more adventurous in their sex life, Sugar's problematic relationships, and Matt exploring his feminine side. Andrew Garfield does not reprise his role as Tom.

Background/production
There were 2 series of the programme, the first airing in 2005 and the second in 2006. Each series consists of ten episodes, each 30 minutes long, including adverts. Episodes do not have individual titles.

Channel 4 stated that Sugar Rush will not be returning for a third series, despite its popularity with viewers and critics alike. Some rumours were that there was not a scheduling spot for it, that it was being removed because of the requirements for Big Brother 8, and because a third series was never originally planned.

A decision had been made to allow new dramas to be made for each month in 2008. However, a spokeswoman confirmed that third and fourth series were never planned, and that the story of the girls had run its course.

Hallinan and Crichlow subsequently spoke out about the cancellation, saying, "the show was an asset to Channel 4. I don't think Channel 4 recognises Sugar Rush was a brave move and did really well for the channel," and adding that the cancellation, "was a last minute thing, especially the way we leave series two [i.e. with Sugar moving in with Kim and Saint and Stella's pregnancy], it sets things up for series three."

Broadcast

The first series was broadcast in 2005 on Channel 4, at 10:50 p.m, but would sometimes air later due to Big Brother 6 UK over-running, with the next episode on E4 afterwards, sometimes overlapping the Channel 4 broadcast. The programme was shown significantly after the watershed.

The first episode of the second series was broadcast on Channel 4 on 15 June 2006, and the last episode was aired on 17 August 2006 on Channel 4, and on 10 August 2006 on digital channel E4.

Series one currently airs on OUTtv in Canada. Re-runs are currently available in the UK, on the Channel 4 streaming service 4OD.

Reception
On 20 November 2006 Sugar Rush (A Shine Production for Channel 4, United Kingdom) was awarded the 34th International Emmy Award classified under "Children & Young People". It ran against "Boys Will Be Boys" (Monster Film for NRK, Norway), "Elias - The Little Rescue Boat" (Filmkameratene AS, Norway) and "Johnny and the Bomb" (Childsplay Television, United Kingdom).

It was nominated for the Best Drama Series BAFTA Television Award in April 2007 - along with Life on Mars and Shameless - but lost to The Street.

Lenora Crichlow's portrayal of the central character Maria Sugar Sweet inspired Burchill to write the 2007 sequel novel Sweet.

Discrepancies with the novel 
The TV series is a very loose adaptation of the 2004 novel of the same name, essentially keeping only partial character names and the same overall location. 

In the novel, Kim Lewis (Daniels in the series) is portrayed as a judgemental 'posh-girl', who is forced to move from her private girls school to infamous local comprehensive Ravendene. There, she befriends Maria 'Sugar' Sweet, the most popular girl in school and the leader of a clique of mean-girls called the 'Ravers'. Sugar introduces Kim to the world of drink, drugs, and sex, leading to a rift between Kim and her childhood best friend, Zoe 'Saint' Clements.  

The events of the novel take place almost entirely within Ravendene, utilising many high-school drama tropes and plot devices. Kim's mother Stella is barely present in the novel, having moved to the Bahamas with a younger man who she met whilst decorating his house before the novel begins. Further discrepancies are present in the characteristics of Sugar and Saint; Sugar is white in the novel, and is portrayed as vapid and unintelligent, whilst Saint is a middle-class black girl, who Burchill describes through Kim as being 'black like Samantha Mumba's black', and having an 'unrealistic black accent' that she 'picked up off Jerry Springer'. Saint is Kim's long-time best friend in the novel, the two having known each other long before Sugar's appearance. 

While the novel has been largely criticised for its prose, stereotyping, and poor characterisation, the series has been conversely praised for its departure from the source material, with modern retrospectives regarding it as a landmark in sincere LGBT representation in British television.

Media information
Both series one and two of Sugar Rush have been released on DVD box-sets. The first series' box-set was released on 15 August 2005. The second series box-set, and a separate series one and two box-set were released on 21 August 2006. An audio CD compilation of the first series' music has also been compiled, but as of September 2006 a similar audio CD to complement series two has yet to materialise. Some of the commercial music used in the TV series has been changed to stock background music for the DVD release.

References

External links
 
 The Sugar Rush Site  
 Article: Fans Hooked on Second Series of Sugar Rush
 34th International Emmy Awards
 

2005 British television series debuts
2006 British television series endings
2000s British LGBT-related drama television series
2000s British teen television series
2000s teen drama television series
Adultery in television
British teen drama television series
Casual sex in television
Channel 4 television dramas
English-language television shows
Lesbian-related television shows
Television series about dysfunctional families
Television series about teenagers
Television series by Endemol
Television shows based on British novels
Television shows set in Brighton
Virginity in television